Inga-Lill Kristina Sjöblom (born 1959) is a Swedish politician and member of the Riksdag, the national legislature. A member of the Social Democratic Party, she has represented Uppsala County since September 2022. She had previously been a substitute member of the Riksdag twice: October 2019 to May 2020 (for Sanne Lennström); and August 2020 to December 2020 (for Ardalan Shekarabi).

Sjöblom is the daughter of metalworker and miller Karl-Gustaf Sjöblom.

References

1959 births
Living people
Members of the Riksdag 2022–2026
Members of the Riksdag from the Social Democrats
Women members of the Riksdag
21st-century Swedish women politicians